Indrapramit Das (also known as Indra Das) is an Indian science fiction, fantasy and cross-genre writer, critic and editor from Kolkata. His fiction has appeared in several publications including Clarkesworld, Asimov’s Science Fiction, Strange Horizons, and Tor.com, and has been widely anthologized in collections including Gardner Dozois' The Year's Best Science Fiction.

His debut novel The Devourers (Penguin Books India, 2015; Del Rey, 2016) won the 29th Annual Lambda Award in LGBT SF/F/Horror category. The Lambda Award celebrates excellence in LGBT literature. The Devourers was shortlisted for 2016 Crawford Award, and included in the 2015 Locus Recommended Reading List. It was also nominated for the Shakti Bhatt First Book Prize and the Tata Live! Literature First Book Award in India.

Das is an Octavia E. Butler Scholar and a graduate of the 2012 Clarion West Writers Workshop. He completed an MFA in Creative Writing at the University of British Columbia in Vancouver.

He is a former consulting editor of speculative fiction for Indian publisher Juggernaut Books.

References

External links 
 
 Writing Global Sci-Fi: White Bread, Brown Toast by Indrapramit Das - Tor.com
 Interview at Mithila Review

Indian male novelists
Indian literary critics
Writers from Kolkata
Indian science fiction writers
Indian fantasy writers
Living people
Year of birth missing (living people)
Lambda Literary Award winners
University of British Columbia alumni
University of Massachusetts Amherst MFA Program for Poets & Writers alumni